Gobo may refer to:

Places
 Gobō, Wakayama, a city located in Wakayama Prefecture, Japan
 Gobō Station, a railway station in the city
 Gobo, Cameroon, a commune in Cameroon

Plants
 Gobō (Arctium lappa), a biennial plant
 Gobo (burdock), the root of the burdock (Arctium), a popular food in Asia

Other definitions

 Gobo (lighting), a template or pattern that controls the shape of the light from a projector or spotlight.
 Gobo (recording), a movable acoustic isolation panel
 Gobo Fraggle, a character in the television series Fraggle Rock
 GoboLinux, a Linux distribution
 Gobo, a character in Bambi, a Life in the Woods